Essentially Yes is a box set by progressive rock band Yes. It was released in 2006 by Eagle Records. It contains five discs, four of which are previously released studio albums; Talk, Open Your Eyes, The Ladder, and Magnification, though not in chronological order. However, it would be in chronological order if one instead uses the 2002 release date of the Talk reissue, which would put the record between disc 3 (2001) and disc 5 (2003) even though Talk was originally released in 1994. The fifth disc is a single CD version of what was later released as the 2CD live album Live at Montreux 2003.

Track listing
 Disc 1: Open Your Eyes
 Disc 2: The Ladder (includes Homeworld preview)
 Disc 3: Magnification
 Disc 4: Talk (includes 2002 bonus track)
 Disc 5: Live at Montreux 2003 (single-disc version)

Personnel
 Jon Anderson: Vocals on all discs.
 Chris Squire: Bass on all discs.
 Steve Howe: Guitar on discs 1, 2, 3, and 5.
 Trevor Rabin: Guitar, backing vocals, keyboards, and string arrangements on disc 4.
 Tony Kaye: Hammond organ on disc 4.
 Rick Wakeman: Keyboards on disc 5.
 Igor Khoroshev: Keyboards on disc 2.
 Billy Sherwood: Guitar and keyboards on discs 1 and 2.
 Alan White: Drums on all discs.

with

 Steve Porcaro: Keyboards on disc 1 track 2.
 Larry Groupé: Orchestra conductor on disc 3.

References

Albums with cover art by Roger Dean (artist)
Albums produced by Trevor Rabin
Albums produced by Bruce Fairbairn
Yes (band) compilation albums
2006 compilation albums